James A. Nash (born September 23, 1967) is an American politician serving in the Minnesota House of Representatives since 2015. A member of the Republican Party of Minnesota, Nash represents District 48A in the western Twin Cities metropolitan area, which includes the cities of Waconia, Victoria, and Chaska, and parts of Carver County.

Early life, education, and career
James Alexander Nash was born on September 23, 1967, in Bay Shore, New York. When he was a child, his family moved around the United States often, traveling to Minnesota in 1968, Colorado in 1975, Texas in 1984, and Arkansas  (where he met his wife Kim) in 1986. Jim and Kim Nash lived in Nebraska from 1992 until 2002.

Nash graduated from the University of Nebraska Omaha with a B.A. in geographic information systems and political geography.

Nash was a chief sales officer for DCIG, and part owner of the company. Before joining DCIG, he led sales divisions for several companies in the transaction processing industry and consulting engineering space. He now works for FRSecure in Minnetonka on its public speaking team, specializing in information security.

Nash was elected to the Waconia City Council in 2008, and served two terms as mayor of Waconia from 2011 to 2014. He was appointed to the Crown College Board of Trustees in 2016.

Minnesota House of Representatives
Nash was elected to the Minnesota House of Representatives in 2014, after the incumbent, Ernie Leidiger, retired, and has been reelected every two years since. In 2014, Nash defeated a primary opponent, Bob Frey, who received news coverage for his controversial views.

In 2015, Nash authored bills expanding rights for firearm owners, reforming the Met Council, relaxing regulation on micro-distilleries, and repealing the Interstate Compact for Juveniles. For these efforts in his first year, he was recognized by the League of Minnesota Cities as a Legislator of Distinction for 2015 and the Legislator of the Year by BATC (Builders Association of the Twin Cities).

Nash served as an assistant majority leader during the 2017-18 legislative session. When Republicans lost the majority he remained in leadership as an assistant minority leader from 2019 to 2022. Nash has served as the minority whip for the Republican House Caucus since 2023. He is the minority lead on the State and Local Government Finance and Policy Committee and sits on the Housing Finance and Policy, Rules and Legislative Administration, and Ways and Means Committees.

Electoral history

References

External links

  official Minnesota House of Representatives website
  official campaign website  voting record - Project Votesmart''

1967 births
Living people
People from Waconia, Minnesota
University of Nebraska Omaha alumni
Republican Party members of the Minnesota House of Representatives
21st-century American politicians